Zhang Huaizhi (1862 – 1934) was  a brigade-general during the Boxer Rebellion; a warlord in the early Chinese Republic; Viceroy of Shandong. He was eliminated in the Second Zhili–Fengtian War.

References

Republic of China warlords from Shandong
Politicians from Tai'an
1862 births
1934 deaths
Empire of China (1915–1916)